Skye Michael Bolt (born January 15, 1994) is an American professional baseball outfielder in the Milwaukee Brewers organization. The Oakland Athletics selected Bolt in the fourth round of the 2015 MLB draft, and he made his MLB debut with them in 2019. He has also played in Major League Baseball (MLB) for the San Francisco Giants.

Early life
Skye Bolt was born in Atlanta, Georgia.  He got his name because his father wanted him to have a name that "popped".

Career

Amateur career

Bolt attended Holy Innocents' Episcopal School in Atlanta, Georgia. He played center field for the school's baseball team, and had a .430 batting average in his senior year.

The Washington Nationals selected Bolt in the 26th round of the 2012 MLB draft. He did not sign, and enrolled at the University of North Carolina at Chapel Hill, where he played college baseball for the North Carolina Tar Heels. As a freshman, he was named Second Team All-Atlantic Coast Conference and a Freshman All-American. He also made USA Baseball's collegiate national baseball team. In 2014, Bolt played collegiate summer baseball with the Harwich Mariners of the Cape Cod Baseball League.

Oakland Athletics
The Oakland Athletics selected Bolt in the fourth round, with the 128th overall selection, of the 2015 MLB draft. He made his professional debut in 2015 with the Vermont Lake Monsters, hitting .238/.325/.381/.706 with 4 home runs and 19 RBIs.

In 2016, he played for the Beloit Snappers, hitting .231/.318/.345/.663 with 5 home runs and 37 RBIs, and was a mid-season All Star. In 2017, he played for the Stockton Ports of the Class A-Advanced California League, hitting .243/.327/.435/.762 with 76 runs (10th in the league), 7 triples (7th), 15 home runs, 53 walks (6th), and 66 RBIs, and was a mid-season All Star. 

In 2018, he began the season with the Midland RockHounds of the Class AA Texas League, but struggled and was sent down to the Stockton Ports, with whom he was a mid-season All Star. He was promoted back to Midland in June. For the week of July 30 through August 5, Bolt was the Texas League's Player of the Week. He hit a combined .260/.347/.474/.821 with 19 home runs, 19 stolen bases, and 69 RBIs during the 2018 season, and was an MiLB Organization All Star. After the season, the Athletics assigned him to the Mesa Solar Sox of the Arizona Fall League, with whom in 73 at bats he hit .247/.353/.493. Also, the Athletics added Bolt to their 40-man roster.

In 2019, he began the season with the Las Vegas Aviators of the Class AAA Pacific Coast League, for whom that season he batted .269/.350/.459/.809 with 11 home runs and 61 RBIs. The Athletics promoted him to MLB on May 3, and he made his MLB debut that night. He had 10 MLB at bats in 2019.

Bolt did not appear in a game for the Athletics in the pandemic-shortened 2020 season. On April 1, 2021, Bolt was designated for assignment by Oakland.

San Francisco Giants
On April 5, 2021, Bolt was claimed off waivers by the San Francisco Giants. On April 30, Bolt was designated for assignment by the Giants following the promotion of Zack Littell. Bolt only appeared in 2 games for the Giants, registering a single plate appearance.

Oakland Athletics (second stint)
On May 5, 2021, Bolt was traded back to the Oakland Athletics in exchange for cash considerations and was assigned to the Triple-A Las Vegas Aviators.  On June 1, Bolt was called up by the Athletics. On June 12, Bolt recorded his first career home run, against Kansas City Royals reliever Wade Davis. With Oakland, he batted .089/.105/.161 in 56 at bats.  However, his 2021 Triple-A Las Vegas Aviators performance was the polar opposite -- crushing a .387/.492/.650 with a minor league career high 16.1% BB rate and lowered his K rate to 21.6%. On September 14, Bolt was sent outright to Triple-A. 

On May 29, 2022, Bolt was placed on the 60-day injured list with a strained left hamstring. Bolt performed well in Triple-A again in 2022, slashing .326/.385/.526 with 4 home runs and 23 RBI in 24 games. In the majors, he appeared a career-high 42 games, hitting .198/.259/.330 with career-bests in home runs (4) and RBI (13). He elected free agency on November 10, 2022.

Milwaukee Brewers
On January 27, 2023, Bolt signed a minor league contract with the Milwaukee Brewers organization.

References

External links

1994 births
Living people
Baseball players from Atlanta
Beloit Snappers players
Harwich Mariners players
Las Vegas Aviators players
Major League Baseball outfielders
Mesa Solar Sox players
Midland RockHounds players
North Carolina Tar Heels baseball players
Oakland Athletics players
San Francisco Giants players
Stockton Ports players
United States national baseball team players
Vermont Lake Monsters players